Rose Island in Lake Starnberg is the only island in the lake and site of a royal villa of King Ludwig II of Bavaria which had been commissioned by his father. He was particularly attached to this place and made frequent renovations and remodelings of the small garden and the villa, which is called casino. Guests on the island were the composer Richard Wagner, his close friend Prince Paul of Thurn and Taxis, Empress Elisabeth of Austria and Grand Duchess Maria Alexandrovna of Russia. The villa is today a small museum, open to the general public and is accessible by a small ferry ride.

It was declared part of the UNESCO World Heritage list in 2011 as one of the 111 locations under the Prehistoric pile dwellings around the Alps listing.

References

External links 

 Bavarian Palace Department | Rose Island

Museums in Bavaria
Castles in Bavaria
Royal residences in Bavaria
Gardens in Bavaria
Historic house museums in Germany
Lake islands of Germany
Starnberg (district)